Mākena State Park comprises  in Makena, south of Wailea on the island of Maui, Hawaii. It contains three separate beaches and a dormant volcanic cinder cone.

Big Beach, also known as "Oneloa Beach" and "Mākena Beach", is a popular spot for sunbathing and bodyboarding by both tourists and locals. The shore is fairly protected from wind. The "Makena cloud" that stretches from the top of Haleakalā to Kahoolawe is often overhead, cooling the sand.

Little Beach, also known as "Puu Ōlai Beach" is a small beach just north of Big Beach separated by a steep lava outcropping (the tip of Puu Ōlai) and a 5-minute hike. On Sunday afternoons/evenings Little Beach is host to celebratory drumming and fire dancing. Little Beach is regarded as a nude beach and nude bathing is common there, although it is de jure illegal due to being in a state park.

Oneuli Beach or Naupaka Beach is a black sand beach on the northern end of the park, closest to Makena.

Just to the south is the Ahihi Kinau Natural Area Reserve.

References

External links

Beaches of Maui
Protected areas of Maui
State parks of Hawaii
Black sand beaches